The Place de la Comédie is square in Montpellier, Hérault in Southern France.

History
The square is first mentioned in 1755 and is named after a theatre that burned down in 1785 and 1855.

At that time, a smaller train going to the nearby beach at Palavas-les-Flots also had its provenance on the Place.

Location
At the centre of the square is a fountain, the Three Graces, built by sculptor Étienne d'Antoine in 1790. The original piece was placed in the Musée Fabre in 1989, but moved again during the refurbishment of the museum to the Opéra Comédie, which is at the square.

At its northeastern corner, the square continues into the Esplanade de Charles de Gaulle, a small park connecting the Place to the Corum, a large concrete and granite complex built by Claude Vasconi.  At its southeastern corner it is linked to the Lycée Joffre, formerly the Citadel of Montpellier.

Buildings and structures in Montpellier
Tourist attractions in Montpellier
Squares in France